Paul Carter (born 30 August 1974) is a retired English professional darts player.

Career

Carter reached the last 16 of the 2002 Winmau World Masters, where he lost to Brian Derbyshire. He also qualified for the inaugural UK Open in 2003, losing 4–5 to Cliff Lazarenko in the second round.

Carter qualified for the 2010 BDO World Darts Championship. He defeated 10th seed Martin Atkins in the first round by 3 sets to 1, but lost in the second round to Martin Phillips.

Personal life
In 2004, Carter had to give up darts temporarily after donating one of his kidneys to his elder sister Donna, who had suffered renal failure.
Paul's wife Caroline gave birth to twins Ashton and Oliver in April 2009.

World Championship Performances

BDO

 2010: 2nd Round (lost to Martin Phillips 1–3)

References

External links

Paul Carter's official website

1974 births
Living people
English darts players
People from Boscombe
British Darts Organisation players